The 1993–94 Moldovan "A" Division season was the 3rd since its establishment. A total of 17 teams contested the league.

League table

References

Moldovan Liga 1 seasons
2
Moldova